Michael Hayes or Mike Hayes may refer to:

Politicians
 Michael Hayes (politician) (1889–1976), Irish Fine Gael politician
 Michael D. Hayes (born 1951), American member of Michigan House of Representatives

Military figures
 J. Michael Hayes, U.S. Marine Corps general
 Michael Joseph Hayes (1894–1918), U.S. Army officer killed in World War 1

Others
 Michael Angelo Hayes,   (1820–1877), Irish watercolourist who specialised in painting horses and military subjects.
 Michael Hayes (wrestler) (born 1959), American wrestler
 Michael Hayes (mass shooter) (born 1964), North Carolina (USA) mass shooter whose case sparked controversy over the insanity defense
 Michael Hayes (TV series), an American TV series
 Mickie Most (Michael Peter Hayes, 1938–2003), English record producer
 Mike Hayes (businessman), English businessman
 Mike Hayes (fighter) (born 1980), American mixed martial artist
 Michael Hayes (director) (1929–2014), British TV director